Several Canadian naval units have been named HMCS Thunder;

 , a  commissioned in 1941 and broken up in 1947.
 , a  commissioned in 1953 and sold to France in 1954.
 , a Bay-class minesweeper commissioned in 1957 and decommissioned in 1997.

Battle honours
 Atlantic, 1941–44
 English Channel, 1944–45
 Normandy, 1944

References

 Government of Canada Ship's Histories - HMCS Thunder

Royal Canadian Navy ship names